AFP most often refers to:

 Agence France-Presse, an international news agency
 Australian Federal Police

AFP or afp may also refer to:

Media

Advertiser-funded programming, a television funding model
American Family Publishers, a magazine subscription company
, a recording industry association in Portugal

Publications 

American Free Press, a weekly newspaper
American Family Physician, a peer-reviewed journal of the American Academy of Family Physicians
Australian Family Physician, a peer-reviewed journal of the Royal Australian College of General Practitioners

Television 

AFP (TV series), a 2011 Australian factual television series
AFP: American Fighter Pilot, a 2002 American television reality show

Organizations
 Armed Forces of the Philippines

Politics
 Alliance of the Forces of Progress (Senegal), a social-democratic political party in Senegal
 America First Party (disambiguation)
 America First Party (1944), an isolationist political party in 1944, renamed the Christian Nationalist Crusade in 1947
 America First Party, another name for the Populist Party (United States, 1984) (1984–96)
 Americans for Prosperity, a Washington, D.C.-based political advocacy group, one of the most influential conservative organizations in the U.S.
 Anarchist Federation of Poland, an anarcho-syndicalist organization that operated in Poland from 1926 to 1939
 Australia First Party, a far-right political party in Australia
 Australian Federation Party, an Australian political party

Science and medicine

 Air-filled porosity, the proportion of a soil's volume that is filled with air at a given time
 Alpha-fetoprotein, a molecule produced in the developing embryo and fetus
 Antifreeze protein, a class of proteins that protect from ice damage in certain vertebrates, plants, fungi, and bacteria
 Antifungal protein, a family of proteins with fungicidal activity
 Atypical facial pain
 Acute flaccid paralysis, a clinical manifestation characterized by paralysis and reduced muscle tone
 Archive of Formal Proofs, a mathematics journal

Technology
 Active fire protection
 , a German gunboat of World War II, a derivative of the 
 Automated fiber placement, a method of manufacturing with composite materials

Computing
 Advanced Function Presentation
Apple Filing Protocol, an Apple remote file access protocol
 Advanced Flexible Processor, a CDC Cyber computer system

People
 A.F.P. Hulsewé (1910–1993), Dutch professor
 Amanda Palmer (born 1976), sometimes known as Amanda Fucking Palmer, a punk cabaret artist formerly in the duo The Dresden Dolls

Other uses
 , a fully funded capitalization system run by private sector pension funds in Chile; See Pensions in Chile
 Tapei language (ISO 639-3 code: afp)

See also
 American Forces Press Service (AFPS)